The Onion is an American digital media company and newspaper organization that publishes satirical articles on international, national, and local news. The company is based in Chicago but originated as a weekly print publication on August 29, 1988, in Madison, Wisconsin. The Onion began publishing online in early 1996. In 2007, they began publishing satirical news audio and video online as the Onion News Network. In 2013, The Onion ceased publishing its print edition and launched Onion Labs, an advertising agency.

The Onions articles cover current events, both real and fictional, parodying the tone and format of traditional news organizations with stories, editorials, and man-on-the-street interviews using a traditional news website layout and an editorial voice modeled after that of the Associated Press. The publication's humor often depends on presenting mundane, everyday events as newsworthy, surreal, or alarming, such as "Rotation Of Earth Plunges Entire North American Continent Into Darkness". In 1999, comedian Bob Odenkirk praised the publication as "the best comedy writing in the country".

The Onion also runs The A.V. Club, an entertainment and pop culture publication founded in 1993 that contains interviews and reviews of newly released media and other weekly features. The Onion previously ran ClickHole, a satirical website founded in 2014 which parodies clickbait websites such as BuzzFeed and Upworthy, before ClickHole was acquired by Cards Against Humanity in February 2020.

History

Publication's name
"People always ask questions about where the name The Onion came from", said former President Sean Mills in an interview with Wikinews; "and, when I recently asked (co-founder) Tim Keck, who was one of the founders, he told me... Literally that his uncle said he should call it The Onion when he saw him and Chris Johnson eating an onion sandwich. They had literally just cut up the onion and put it on bread." According to former editorial manager, Chet Clem, their food budget was so low when they started the paper that they were down to white bread and onions. This account was disputed by an editor of The Onion, Cole Bolton, during an event at the University of Chicago. Bolton called Mills's account "the dumbest explanation" and asserted that it is likely wrong. According to Bolton, the most plausible explanation is that The Onion was mocking a campus newsletter called The Union.

Madison (1988–2001) 
Conceived by University of Wisconsin students Tim Keck and Christopher Johnson, The Onion was founded as a weekly print newspaper for satirical news in 1988 in Madison, Wisconsin, by Keck and Johnson with their friends Scott Dikkers as cartoonist and Peter Haise as publisher. In 1989, Keck and Johnson sold the paper to Dikkers and Haise for $16,000 ($19,000 according to some sources). After the sale, Keck and Johnson separately became publishers of similar alternative weeklies: Keck of The Stranger in Seattle, Washington, and Johnson of the Weekly Alibi in Albuquerque, New Mexico. Haise left The Onion after 15 years and eventually opened a custom framing shop in Wauwatosa, Wisconsin. Dikkers, who originally joined the staff as a cartoonist, said he was de facto editor by the third issue and became The Onions longest-serving editor in chief (1988–1999, 2005–2008).

In its earlier years, The Onion was successful in a number of university locations (e.g., University of Wisconsin–Madison and University of Illinois at Urbana–Champaign). The publication primarily consisted of a mix of Dikkers's cartoons, Spy magazine-like satire, and short fiction. The bottom three inches were reserved as ad space for coupons that were typically purchased by local, student-centered or inexpensive establishments, such as eateries and video rental stores.

The June 16, 1993, issue of The Daily Iowan ran a profile of Dikkers, in which it stated that "Dikkers still lives in Madison, spending about five hours a week on Jim's Journal and the rest of the time as co-owner of a satirical newspaper called The Onion".

In a 1994 interview with U. Magazine, Dikkers discussed Onion, Inc.'s plans to create a new sketch comedy show called The Comedy Castaways, which they were in the process of pitching to NBC, Fox, and HBO. With a pilot and the first two episodes in post-production, Dikkers said, "I think what sets us apart is we've intentionally formed a tightly knit group of funny performers. A lot of these other shows are created by 50-year-olds, written by 40-year-olds and performed by 35-year-olds".

In the spring of 1996, Ben Karlin and Dikkers collaborated with Robert Smigel and Dana Carvey to create four short Onion news segments for The Dana Carvey Show. Smigel said that after being introduced to The Onion by Bob Odenkirk a year earlier, "it jumped out at me as something completely original and great, and I really wanted to use it on the show". Although four fake news segments anchored by Stephen Colbert were recorded, only one of the segments actually aired.

In 1996, when it was still only a print newspaper, an Onion article titled "Clinton Deploys Vowels to Bosnia" was widely disseminated online without attribution, spurring the creation of The Onions official website (theonion.com) so they could properly claim credit for content that was being passed around online forums such as Usenet and various mailing lists. The publication received expanded global recognition as a result of the website as well. In a 2002 interview, then-editor in chief Rob Siegel said, "If you look at the breakdown of people who read The Onion online, it's like Microsoft, Dell Computers, the Department of Justice and then, like, University of Wisconsin. So it's a combination of students and pretty impressive people. I get the feeling that the print version is read by people hanging out in bars".

In the fall of 1996, Ben Karlin, who had been a writer/editor for the publication since graduating from the University of Wisconsin in 1993, moved to Los Angeles and joined other former Onion staff members to create a pilot for a news parody titled Deadline: Now for the Fox Network. While the 15-minute pilot, which was completed in 1997, was never picked up as a series for production, its creation led to steady writing work for Karlin and other former Onion staffers, such as writing some episodes of Space Ghost Coast to Coast on the Cartoon Network. In the wake of Karlin's departure, Siegel assumed the publication's duties as editor of the publication.

Sometime after The Onion appeared online in 1996, the publication was threatened with a lawsuit from Janet Jackson because of the article "Dying Boy Gets Wish: To Pork Janet Jackson". "We were very nearly sued out of existence by Janet Jackson", said Siegel, adding that in the past he was forbidden to talk about the legal matter and the celebrity involved.

On January 27, 1998, MTV premiered Virtual Bill, a collaboration between writers of The Onion and 3-D character studio Protozoa. The titular "Virtual Bill" character was a quasi-realistic CGI version of Bill Clinton created by studio Protozoa who introduced music videos and told jokes written by the staff of The Onion. The voice of Virtual Bill was provided by then editor Dikkers. After the initial premiere, Virtual Bill returned to MTV on December 17, 1998, with another TV special and an interactive web special produced by Pulse that ported the 3D data into a web compatible format using Pulse's proprietary plug-in.

In January 1999, when Jon Stewart became the host of The Daily Show he tapped former Onion writer/editor Karlin to be head writer of the newly restructured show. "He had heard about this group of Onion people in L.A. and, in a weird way, I was the de facto ringleader of our group in L.A. I came to New York. Jon and I connected. It was kind of like a slightly awkward, but successful, first date. When I got back to Los Angeles, they offered me the head writer job".

From March 3–7, 1999, writers and editors of The Onion attended U.S. Comedy Arts Festival in Aspen, Colorado in part to promote the forthcoming Our Dumb Century anthology and were met with effusive praise for their work from notable comedians such as Conan O'Brien, Dave Foley and Dave Thomas as well as cartoonist Peter Bagge and musician Andy Prieboy.

On March 18, 1999, The Onions website won its first Webby Award in the category of "Humor".

On March 23, 1999, The Onions first fully original book, Our Dumb Century was released. The book featured mocked-up newspaper front pages from the entire 20th century, presented under the premise that the publication had been continuously in print since before 1900. In the wake of the book's success, networks such as HBO and NBC were in talks to bring The Onion to TV with a special based on Our Dumb Century.

Despite nearly two years of work spent on conceiving and producing Our Dumb Century, the writers only received bonuses of a few thousand dollars, despite the fact that the two-book publishing deal netted The Onion $450,000.

In April 2000, DreamWorks Studios optioned two stories from the satirical newspaper, "Canadian Girlfriend Unsubstantiated"—which was to be written by former Onion editor and writer Rich Dahm—and "Tenth Circle Added to Rapidly Growing Hell" with an eye toward producing the latter as a family comedy. "The story is so dark and hate filled—I was shocked", said head writer Todd Hanson. "It's like an Onion joke. I mean, what are they going to do? Add a sickly-but-adorable moppet?" added editor Robert Siegel. DreamWorks planned for the finished "Tenth Circle Added to Rapidly Growing Hell" to involve animation as well as musical singalongs.

In June 2000, writers and editors of The Onion participated in Comedy Central panel discussion moderated by Jeff Greenfield titled "The State of The Onion" during the "Toyota Comedy Festival 2000".

In July 2000, The Onions editor Robert Siegel was named one of People magazine's most eligible bachelors. "If a person is beautiful on the inside", Siegel said, "looks don't really matter".

New York City (2001–2012) 

Beginning in the fall of 2000 to early 2001, the company relocated its editorial offices from Madison, Wisconsin, to a renovated warehouse in the Chelsea neighborhood of Manhattan (New York City) to raise The Onions profile, expand the publication from being simply a humor newspaper into a full production company, as well as develop editorial content in other media—including books, television and movies—and engage more directly with Internet companies as far as advertising revenue goes.

In February 2001, Miramax Films head Harvey Weinstein announced they had reached a first look agreement to develop scripts and features with The Onion. "As lifelong New Yorkers, we're proud to welcome The Onion to our city with this first-look deal", said Harvey Weinstein. "With their witty, sophisticated humor, they will undoubtedly soon be the toast of the town", Weinstein added.

On September 27, 2001, The Onion debuted its New York City print edition with an issue focused on the September 11 attacks. The popularity, and critical praise, of the issue resulted in The Onions website's online traffic nearly doubling in the weeks following the attacks.

In November 2002, a humorous op-ed piece in The Onion that was satirically bylined by filmmaker Michael Bay titled "Those Chechen Rebels Stole My Idea" was removed from the site without explanation. Entertainment industry trade magazine Variety theorized, "It's not clear if Bay—a frequent object of The Onions satire—requested the move."

In 2003, The Onion was purchased by David Schafer, who had previously managed the $2.5 billion investment fund, from previous long time owners Peter Haise and Scott Dikkers. The sale was a process that had been in the works since July 2001 and according to a memo from then owner Haise, "[Schafer] understands our quirky company and knows that we need some time to get to a higher level of operations and sales." In a 2003 CNN profile of The Onion, Schafer stated with regards to the company and the purchase, "The Onions strong point was never accounting, financial management, or business. Buying it was a bit of a shot in the dark, but we felt we could get a handle on it." Also in 2003, editor Robert Siegel quit his day-to-day role at The Onion to focus on writing screenplays full-time. "After the 14,000th headline I felt the itch to use a different part of my brain", he said. "You can go mad thinking in headline form." In the wake of his departure, long time staff writer Carol Kolb assumed the publication's duties as editor of the publication.

In 2005, The Onion moved its New York City offices from its initial Chelsea location to downtown on Broadway in the SoHo neighborhood of Manhattan (New York City).

In 2006, The Onion had reached a print circulation of 549,000; it was distributed for free in several cities. The same year, it launched a YouTube channel, which was structured as a parody of modern American television news programs. In June 2006, it was also announced that Siegel had been tapped by Miramax Films to write the screenplay for a comedy titled "Homeland Insecurity" which was slated to be about a pair of Arab-Americans who are mistaken for terrorists while traveling to Texas. Additionally, rumors of a potential sale of The Onion to media conglomerate Viacom began appearing in various news outlets during July 2006 with The New York Times: DealBook expanding on the discussion by stating, "While a source tells DealBook that such a deal has indeed been discussed, it is in very early stages and may never happen."

In April 2007, The Onion launched the Onion News Network, a parody of "the visual style and breathless reporting of 24-hour cable news networks like CNN."

In 2008 Carol Kolb became the head writer of the Onion News Network with the role of the publication's editor being taken over by writer Joe Randazzo. Randazzo first became a writer for The Onion in 2006 and—in his role as an editor—became the first editor of the publication that had no connection to The Onion during the publication's initial Madison, Wisconsin, era.

In April 2009, The Onion was awarded a 2008 Peabody Award noting that the publication provides "...ersatz news that has a worrisome ring of truth."

In November 2009, The Onion released Our Front Pages: 21 Years of Greatness, Virtue, and Moral Rectitude From America's Finest News Source which was notable in not only compiling dozens of front pages from the publication's history as a news parody but also showcasing front pages from the publication's early, more casual campus humor focused era during the 1980s when the publication featured headlines such as, "Depressed? Try Liposuction on that Pesky Head."

In July 2009, various news outlets began reporting rumors of an impending sale of The Onion with further details of the sale to be made on Monday, July 20, 2009. The purported sale was revealed as fictional Publisher Emeritus T. Herman Zweibel stating he'd sold the publication to a Chinese company—Yu Wan Mei Corporation—resulting in a week-long series of Chinese-related articles and features throughout the publication's website and print editions. On Wednesday, July 22, 2009, the publication's editor (Joe Randazzo) clarified the issue on National Public Radio's All Things Considered, stating: "I'm sure there are many Chinese conglomerates out there that would love to buy The Onion. We are, in fact, still a solvent independently owned American company."

In August 2011, The Onions website began testing a paywall model, requiring a $2.95 monthly/$29.95 annual charge from non-U.S. visitors who wish to read more than about five stories within 30 days. "We are testing a meter internationally as readers in those markets are already used to paying directly for some (other) content, particularly in the UK where we have many readers", said the company's CTO Michael Greer.

In September 2011, it was announced that The Onion would move its entire editorial operation to Chicago by the summer of 2012. The news of the move left many of the writers—who moved with the publication from Madison to New York City in 2000—"blindsided", putting them in a position to decide whether to uproot themselves from New York City and follow the publication to Chicago, which was already home to the company's corporate headquarters. At a comedy show on September 27, 2011, then editor Joe Randazzo announced that he would not be joining the staff in Chicago.

Chicago (2012–present)
With the publication's core editorial staff now based in Chicago, in March 2012 Cole Bolton—a Brown University graduate of business economics, former associate economist at the Federal Reserve Bank of Chicago and research associate at Harvard Business School—was named the new editor-in-chief of The Onion. "I was never in an improv group, never in a sketch group, never wrote for an Onion parody in college", said Bolton in a 2014 interview with comedy publication Splitsider. "It was just sort of a decision that I decided, two years out of college, that I didn’t like where I was going in my life, and I wanted to do something that I cared about more, so I ended up just sending stuff in to The Onion."

Additionally, in March 2012 more insight into the internal issues surrounding the Chicago move—including an attempt made by the writers to find a new owner—are explored by articles in The Atlantic Wire and New York magazine's Daily Intelligencer. According to an article in the Chicago Tribune, founding editor Scott Dikkers returned to the publication in light of the Chicago move stating that he hopes to find a "younger and hungrier" pool of talent in Chicago than what was available in New York City. "The Onion is obviously always going to draw talent from wherever it is", Dikkers said. "In Madison, people used to just come in off the street [...] and we'd give them a shot. The Onion has always thrived on the youngest, greenest people."

In August 2012, it was announced that a group of former The Onion writers had teamed up with Adult Swim to create comedy content on a website called Thing X. According to the comedy website Splitsider, "The Onion writers had nothing else going on, and AdultSwim.com wanted to take advantage of that. But only because they smelled a business opportunity. Adult Swim is just looking at it from a business standpoint." In June 2013, it was announced that Thing X would be shutting down with some staff moving over to parent website adultswim.com on June 18, 2013. In February 2013 The Onion was added to Advertising Ages "Digital A-List 2013" because the publication "...has not just survived, it's thrived..." since the publication's 2012 move to consolidate operations and staff in Chicago.

In November 2013, the publication announced in Crain's Chicago Business that The Onion would move to an all-digital format by December 2013, citing a 30% year-over-year growth in pageviews to the publication's website.

In 2013, The Onion received an email from Michael Cohen claiming that an article published about Donald Trump was defamation, and demanded that it be removed with an apology.

In June 2014, The Onion launched the spinoff website ClickHole, which satirizes and parodies so-called "clickbait" websites such as BuzzFeed and Upworthy that capitalize on viral content to drive traffic.

In November 2014, Bloomberg News reported that The Onion had hired a financial adviser for a possible sale. Additionally, in a memo addressing potential sale rumors provided to Walt Mossberg's tech site Re/code Onion CEO Steve Hannah states, "We have had follow-up conversations with numerous parties in recent months. Our advisors will continue to have those conversations and, hopefully, they will lead to the right outcome."

In June 2015 Steve Hannah—the publication's CEO since 2004— stepped down from the position with the new CEO role passed onto current president of the organization, Mike McAvoy.

On September 21, 2015, StarWipe—a spinoff sister site of The A.V. Club centered on celebrity culture—was launched. It was closed on June 17, 2016.

In October 2015, CEO Mike McAvoy announced a restructuring of the organization, layoffs as well as a series of management changes. "But even though we’ve done well, we have not been able to keep pace with our ambitious goals for Onion Inc." Kurt Mueller—the company's COO—elaborated on the details stating, "We were overstaffed for the non-media-agency part of the business. We have less demand for a ton of new content for a brand. There's demand, but we just overestimated what the demand is."

In January 2016, Univision Communications  purchased a 40% stake in Onion, Inc. "As an independent media company, we’ve always been forced to run a tight financial ship, which has made us smart and lean, but not always ready to invest in the great new ideas that we come up with," Mr. McAvoy said in a memo to staff. "I’m excited to see what we can do with Univision behind us." This brings The Onion into the Fusion Media Group arm of Univision, the same media family as the Gizmodo collection of sites (Kotaku, Lifehacker, Deadspin, etc.), which also has led to a consolidated media management platform and aligned content presentation styles with these sister sites.

In January 2017, The Onion partnered with Lionsgate Films and production company Serious Business to develop multiple film projects. "We've plotted our takeover of the film industry for some time", said Kyle Ryan, vice president of Onion Studios, in a wry statement. "With the help of Serious Business and Lionsgate, we'll make room on our award shelf for some Oscars. To the basement you go, Pulitzers." Serious Business is a production company run by former UTA Online co-founder Jason U. Nadler, @midnight co-creator Jon Zimelis and writer/producer Alex Blagg.

In September 2017, the site's editor-in-chief Cole Bolton and executive editor Ben Berkley were stepped down from their posts. Chad Nackers—The Onion’s head writer—will take over as the role of editor-in-chief. The departures were partially due to disagreements about the direction the site was taking under the ownership of Univision.

In April 2018 the employees of the company unionized with The Writers Guild Of America, East. The union comprises "all of the creative staffs at Onion Inc.: The A.V. Club, The Onion, ClickHole, The Takeout, Onion Labs, and Onion Inc.’s video and art departments." and reached a contract agreement with management on December 20, 2018.

In July 2018, rumors of pending layoffs at The Onion and related websites Clickhole and The A.V. Club were reported. Corporate parent Univision Communications is said to be looking to reduce the staff of the humor publication by around 15% amidst news of a pending sale of The Onion and related websites as well as Gizmodo Media Group assets. As stated an official Univision press release on the topic, "Univision Communications Inc. (UCI) […] today announced that the Company has initiated a formal process to explore the sale of the assets comprising the Gizmodo Media Group (GMG) and The Onion."

On April 8, 2019, private equity firm Great Hill Partners acquired Gizmodo Media Group—including The Onion, The A.V. Club, and Clickhole—from Univision for an undisclosed amount. The properties will be formed into a new company named G/O Media Inc.

Print edition (1988–2013)
During The Onion print edition's 25-year run—from the publication's initial creation in 1988 to the end of the print edition in 2013—it was distributed for free in various cities across the United States and Canada as well as via paid mail order subscription to subscribers around the world. By the time the print edition of The Onion ceased publication in December 2013, it was only available in Chicago, Milwaukee and Providence. At its peak, The Onion had a print circulation of about 500,000 while the publication's websites brought in more than 10 million unique monthly visitors. Below is a list of all of the cities in which The Onion was distributed freely at different points from 1988 to 2013.

 Ann Arbor, Michigan
 Austin, Texas
 Boulder, Colorado
 Champaign–Urbana, Illinois
 Chicago
 Columbus, Ohio
 Denver, Colorado
 Indianapolis
 Iowa City
 Los Angeles
 Madison, Wisconsin
 Milwaukee
 Minneapolis–Saint Paul
 New York City
 Omaha, Nebraska
 Philadelphia
 Pittsburgh
 Providence, Rhode Island
 San Francisco
 Santa Fe, New Mexico
 Toronto, Ontario, Canada
 Washington, D.C.

Regular features

Regular features of The Onion include:
 "Statshot", an illustrated statistical snapshot which parodies "USA Today Snapshots."
 "Infographics", with a bulleted lists of jokes on a theme.
 Opinion columns, including mock editorials, point-counterpoints, and pieces from regular columnists.
 Bizarre horoscopes.
 Slideshows that parody content aggregation sites like Huffington Post and Buzzfeed, usually accompanied by a "click-bait"-style headline.
 "News in Photos" that feature a photograph and caption with no accompanying story.
 "American Voices" (formerly called "What Do You Think?"), a mock vox populi survey on a topical current event. There are three respondents—down from the original six—for each topic, who appear to represent a diverse selection of demographics. Although their names and professions change each time they are used, photos of the same people are almost always used, with one of them often described as a systems analyst.
 An editorial cartoon drawn by "Kelly", a fictional cartoonist. The cartoons are actually the work of artist Ward Sutton and they are a deadpan parody of conservative editorial cartoons, as well as editorial cartoons in general. Many of the cartoons feature the Statue of Liberty, usually shedding a single tear—of joy or anguish—depending on the situation.
 A Person of the Year award, in 2014 honoring Malala Yousafzai and John Cena
 'No Way to Prevent This', Says Only Nation Where This Regularly Happens", a story republished with minor edits after major mass shootings in the United States. The story was first published in response to the 2014 Isla Vista killings.

Editors and writers
As of 2022, the current editor of The Onion is Chad Nackers. Past editors and writers have included:

 Max Cannon
 Rich Dahm
 Scott Dikkers
 Megan Ganz
 Joe Garden
 Todd Hanson
 Tim Harrod
 David Javerbaum
 Ben Karlin
 Ellie Kemper
 Peter Koechley
 Carol Kolb
 Joe Randazzo
 Maria Schneider
 Robert D. Siegel
 Jack Szwergold
 Baratunde Thurston
 Dan Vebber

Books, video, film and audio

Books
Since the first publication of Our Dumb Century in 1999, The Onion has produced various books that often compile already produced material into collected volumes. The 2007 publication of Our Dumb World and the 2012 publication of The Onion Book Of Known Knowledge are the only other fully original books content-wise—other than Our Dumb Century—that The Onion has released.

Onion News Network

In April 2007, The Onion launched Onion News Network—a daily web video broadcast—with a story about an illegal immigrant taking an executive's $800,000-a-year job for $600,000 a year. The publication reportedly initially invested about $1 million in the production and initially hired 15 new staffers to focus on the production of this video broadcast. On February 3, 2009, The Onion launched a spin-off of the Onion News Network called the Onion Sports Network.

In a Wikinews interview in November 2007, former Onion President Mills said the Onion News Network had been a huge hit. "We get over a million downloads a week, which makes it one of the more successful produced-for-the-Internet videos", said Mills. "If we're not the most successful, we're one of the most.'

In January 2011, The Onion launched two TV shows on cable networks: Onion SportsDome which premiered January 11 on Comedy Central, and the Onion News Network which premiered January 21 on Independent Film Channel (IFC). Later in the year IFC officially announced the renewal of the Onion News Network for a second season in March 2011 while Comedy Central officially announced the cancellation of Onion SportsDome in June 2011.

In August 2011, the Writers Guild of America, East, AFL–CIO, announced the unionization of the Onion News Network writing staff, averting a potential strike which hinged on pay and benefits. It is also not the first time Onion, Inc. has been criticized for the way it treats its employees: In June 2011 A.V. Club Philadelphia city editor Emily Guendelsberger was the victim of an attack and—according to the Philadelphia Daily News—her job did not provide health insurance to cover hospital bills. According to the WGA, Onion News Network was the only scripted, live-action program that had employed non-union writers. "The ONN writers stood together and won real improvements", said WGAE Executive Director Lowell Peterson. "We welcome them into the WGAE and we look forward to a productive relationship with the company." Peterson noted that more than 70 Guild members from all of the New York-based comedy shows signed a letter supporting the Onion News Network writers, and hundreds of Guild members sent emails to the producers.

In March 2012, IFC officially announced the cancellation of the Onion News Network. After the show's cancellation, a pilot for a new comedy series titled Onion News Empire premiered on Amazon.com in April 2013, which presented as a behind-the-scenes look of The Onions newsroom. The pilot was one of several candidates for production on Amazon, but was not ultimately selected.

Video
 Today Now!: a parody of a morning talk show
 Onion Film Standard with Peter K. Rosenthal: Movie critic Peter K. Rosenthal (played by Ron E. Rains) presents his views on famous films, both classic and contemporary.
 Onion Social: a parody of Facebook.
 In the Know with Clifford Banes: a parody news talk show
 Mothershould with Grace Manning-Devlin: a parody of women's issues YouTube vlogs
The Whole Body: Satire health tips.
Good Taste: Recipes and cooking videos.
 EDGE: a parody of the HBO non-fiction program VICE
 Owner's Box: a parody of ESPN and other sports-news programs
Sportology: parodies an investigation of sport science. 
O-Span: A parody of C-SPAN.
Now: Focus: A parody of NowThis News.
Onion Explains: Short videos giving a brief explanation of a topic.
Onion Insights: 

In 2008, The Onion launched a series of YouTube videos produced by its 'Onion Digital Studios' division, funded in part by a grant from YouTube and exclusive to the site. Series produced were:
 Sex House: A dark satire of reality show culture and negligent producers.
 Lake Dredge Appraisal: A show centering on the dredged salvage of a lake, appraised of its worth on public access television.
 Trouble Hacking with Drew Cleary: A mock Life Hacking Q and A series.
 Horrifying Planet: A nihilistic parody of nature documentaries.
 Onion Talks: A satire of TED Talks.
 Porkin' Across America with Jim Haggerty: An on-the-road food reality show featuring Jim Haggerty from Today Now.
 America's Best: An American Idol parody.
 Dr. Good: Parody of The Dr. Oz Show.

The Onion Movie

The Onion Movie is a direct-to-video film written by then-Onion editor Robert D. Siegel and writer Todd Hanson and directed by Tom Kuntz and Mike Maguire. Created in 2003, Fox Searchlight Pictures was on board to release the movie, originally called The Untitled Onion Movie, but at some point in the process, directors Kuntz and Maguire—as well as writer Siegel—walked away from the project. In 2006, New Regency Productions took over the production of the troubled project. After two years of being in limbo, the film was released directly on DVD on June 3, 2008. Upon its release it was credited as being directed under the pseudonym of James Kleiner but is still directed by Kuntz and Maguire.

In the spring of 2014, former president, publisher, and CEO of The Onion Peter Haise filed a lawsuit Palm Beach County court against the publication's current chairman David K. Schafer regarding a missing "Executive Producer" credit on the failed film. As stated in the lawsuit, "Onion, Inc. has admitted that Haise was involved in and should have been named as an Executive Producer of the Film, and that the omission in the credits listed for the Film was an error."

Onion Radio News
The Onion Radio News was an audio podcast/radio show produced by The Onion from 1999 and 2009. The core voice of the podcast was that of a fictional newsreader named "Doyle Redland" who was voiced by Pete S. Mueller. At its peak Onion Radio News was picked up by the Westwood One radio network as well as Audible.com.

Onion Public Radio
On February 5, 2018, The Onion published its first podcast, titled A Very Fatal Murder. It was released in six parts and parodies other true crime podcasts such as Serial and My Favorite Murder. The story follows Onion Public Radio reporter David Pascall (voiced by David Sidorov) as he tries to investigate the murder of a 17-year-old girl named Hayley Price in the fictional town of Bluff Springs, Nebraska.

On January 16, 2020, The Onion expanded its podcast formula to include The Topical, a news podcast which parodies the style and format of NPR drive-time news broadcasts.

Influence and controversies

Taken seriously
Occasionally, the straight-faced manner in which The Onion reports non-existent events, happenings and ideas has resulted in third parties mistakenly citing The Onion stories as real news.
 98 Homosexual-Recruitment Drive Nearing Goal": In 1998, Fred Phelps posted The Onion article on his Westboro Baptist Church website as apparent "proof" that homosexuals were indeed actively trying to "recruit" others to be gay.
 "Congress Passes Americans With No Abilities Act": At various times since the article's initial publication in 1998, variants of the "Americans With No Abilities Act" article and theme have been passed around online including a variant in 2009 that changed the stated U.S. President from Bill Clinton to Barack Obama as well as a 2007 variant that changed the country from the United States of America to Australia.
 "Harry Potter Books Spark Rise in Satanism Among Children": Beginning in the year 2000, an article on Harry Potter inciting children to practice witchcraft was the subject of a widely forwarded email which repeated the quotes attributed to children in the article. Columnist Ellen Makkai and others who believe the Harry Potter books "recruit" children to Satanism have also been taken in by the article, using quotes directly from it to support their claims.
 "Congress Threatens To Leave D.C. Unless New Capitol Is Built": On June 7, 2002, Reuters reported that the Beijing Evening News republished and translated portions of the article. The article is a parody of U.S. sports franchises' threats to leave their home city unless new stadiums are built for them. The Beijing Evening News initially stood by the story, demanding proof of its falsehood but later retracted the article, responding that "...some small American newspapers frequently fabricate offbeat news to trick people into noticing them with the aim of making money."
 "Prague's Franz Kafka International Named World's Most Alienating Airport": On the March 24, 2009, broadcast of Late Night with Jimmy Fallon, Fallon's monologue used the topic of that specific Onion News Network video as a set-up for another joke claiming the report was based on a "study."
 "Conspiracy Theorist Convinces Neil Armstrong Moon Landing Was Faked": In September 2009, two Bangladeshi newspapers—The Daily Manab Zamin and the New Nation—published stories translated from The Onion claiming that astronaut Neil Armstrong had held a news conference claiming the moon landing was an elaborate hoax.
 "Denmark Introduces Harrowing New Tourism Ads Directed By Lars Von Trier": In February 2010, online newspapers such as Il Corriere della Sera (Italy) and Adresseavisen (Norway) repackaged clips from The Onion video piece as legitimate news.
 "Frustrated Obama Sends Nation Rambling 75,000-Word E-Mail": In November 2010, the Fox Nation website presented The Onion article as a genuine report.
 "Congress Takes Group Of Schoolchildren Hostage": In September 2011, United States Capitol Police investigated a series of tweets coming from The Onions Twitter account claiming that U.S. congressmen were holding twelve children hostage.
 "Obama Openly Asks Nation Why On Earth He Would Want To Serve For Another Term": On January 7, 2012, Lim Hwee Hua—a former Singaporean MP—posted the article on her Facebook page.
 "Planned Parenthood Opens $8 Billion Abortionplex": On February 3, 2012, U.S. Congressman John Fleming (R-Louisiana) posted a link to the article on his Facebook page.
 "Gallup Poll: Rural Whites Prefer Ahmadinejad to Obama": On September 28, 2012, Iran's Fars News Agency copied The Onion story verbatim on their website. The Onion updated the original story with the note: "For more on this story: Please visit our Iranian subsidiary organization, Fars", linking to a screenshot of Fars's coverage of the story.
 "Kim Jong-Un Named The Onion's Sexiest Man Alive For 2012": On November 27, 2012, the online version of the Chinese Communist Party newspaper The People's Daily ran a story on Kim Jong-un, citing The Onion's article as a source and even included a 55-page photo gallery with the article in tribute to the North Korean leader.
 "Fred Phelps, Man Who Forever Stopped March Of Gay Rights, Dead At 84": In March 2014, Ed Farrell—the Vice Mayor of Maricopa, Arizona—apologized for inadvertently and enthusiastically praising Fred Phelps via a post of the satirical obituary on his Facebook page. In an interview about his Facebook post Farrell apologized for doing it, stating "I had no clue about this guy; he's an idiot. I can't believe that I posted what I posted [...] shame on me."
 "FIFA Frantically Announces 2015 Summer World Cup In United States": In May 2015, the former FIFA vice president Jack Warner—who was arrested on corruption charges that same month—drew attention to The Onion article by reporting it as real news in a video on Facebook.
 "Study: Every 10 Seconds A Skyscraper Window Washer Falls To His Death": In September 2018, Serbian president Aleksandar Vučić made the statement commenting on the death of two workers who died working on the Belgrade Waterfront construction site. He expressed his condolences to the families, but said that "in Serbia, there are proportionally a lot less accidents in dangerous jobs, such as construction. As for the allegations aimed against the state, I want to tell the citizens—even though I did not want to speak about it—that I read some data. Did you know that, in America, every ten seconds one window washer dies doing his job?".
 "CIA Issues Posthumous Apology After New Evidence Clears Osama Bin Laden Of Involvement In 9/11 Attacks": On October 13, 2019, former Inspector-General of the Royal Malaysian Police Musa Hassan received criticism after promoted the titled post as real news on Twitter, and then doubling down when other Twitter users pointed out the satirical nature of the site, remarking "Wait for The Onion to deny it. If not, it means that America allows the spreading of fake news."

As a political actor
Several commentators have characterized The Onions satire as overtly political. Noreen Malone characterized the publication as having a left-leaning outlook by stating:

Malone—like other pundits—specifically noted the publication's sharp take on the Syrian Civil War, with David Weigel characterizing the publication's stance as effectively being "…advocacy for intervention in Syria." Weigel attributed the trend toward more news satire—including political news satire—as being a byproduct of the publication's shorter turnaround times after the Internet edition became the main outlet for the publication's voice, endangering The Onion of becoming a "…hivemind version of Andy Borowitz, telling liberals that what they already think is not only true but oh-so-arch." Slate's Farhad Manjoo similarly attributed the publication's "…faster, bigger, more strident, and, to me, a little inconsistent…" vibe to the exigencies of the Internet.

Emmett Rensin claimed The Onion is an important if unintentional fomenter of Marxist thought in America:

According to Rensin, examples of indictments of false consciousness, commodity fetishization and valorization of the invisible hand also abound. Rensin attributes the material to the humorists' need to work from "obvious, intuitive truth—the kind necessary for any kind of broadly appealing humor" rather than a conscious decision to promote Marxism.

Some of the publication's political impact is unintentional. For example, the Onions long-running caricature of Joe Biden as a blue-collar "creepy but harmless uncle" character is often believed to have positively affected the real Joe Biden's public image. In May 2019, the former Onion editor Joe Garden published an op-ed in Vice to express his regret over the character, which he felt had distracted from serious concerns about Biden's political record and personal behavior.

In 2017, President Donald Trump expressed confidence that his son-in-law Jared Kushner, whom he had just appointed as an advisor on foreign affairs, could bring peace to the Middle East. An Onion article then made fun of the idealistic way in which Trump treated the long, complicated and bloody conflict as a mere organisational issue he could delegate, reporting that peace between Israel and Arabia was just too big for Kushner to achieve within the already started office week and now had to be shifted into the subsequent week. The article was then passed around by White House staffers who were apparently alienated by Kushner's appointment.

U.S. Presidential Seal dispute

In September 2005, the assistant counsel to President George W. Bush, Grant M. Dixton, wrote a cease-and-desist letter to The Onion, asking the publication to stop using the presidential seal, which it used in an online parody of Bush.

The Onion responded with a formal request to use the seal in accordance with the executive order, while maintaining that its use was legitimate. The letter stated, "It is inconceivable that anyone would think that, by using the seal, The Onion intends to 'convey... sponsorship or approval' by the president", but then went on to ask that the letter be considered a formal application requesting permission to use the seal.

85th Academy Awards controversy
During the 85th Academy Awards, a post on The Onions Twitter account called 9-year-old Best Actress nominee Quvenzhané Wallis "a cunt". The post was deleted within an hour, but not before hundreds of angry responses. CEO Steve Hannah issued an apology to Wallis and the Academy of Motion Picture Arts and Sciences, calling the remarks "crude and offensive" and "No person should be subjected to such a senseless, humorless comment masquerading as satire." Scott Dikkers—who was Vice President Creative Development for the publication at the time—said in an interview with NBC 5 Chicago that the publication had sent an apology note to Quvenzhané and her family but also stated, "She's a big star now. I think she can take it." The publication's public apology was denounced by some former Onion writers, with one stating, "It wasn't a great joke, but big deal."

Murder of The Big Show
On June 16, 2017, The Onion featured an article describing professional wrestler The Big Show being killed by WWE after a seven-year-old boy wandered into a steel cage during a live event in Indianapolis. The article, meant to lampoon the real-life killing of Harambe, a gorilla in a Cincinnati zoo, received criticism for satirizing the murder of an actual person as well as leading some fans to believe Big Show was dead.

Amicus brief in Novak v. City of Parma

On October 3, 2022, The Onion filed its first amicus curiae brief with the Supreme Court of the United States in the case of Novak v. City of Parma. The Onion supported the certiorari petition of Anthony Novak, who was seeking civil damages after having been arrested and unsuccessfully prosecuted over a Facebook page parodying the page of the Parma Police Department. The Onion brief contained numerous jokes, including a claimed readership of 4.3 trillion, a remark that "the federal judiciary is staffed entirely by total Latin dorks", and a boast regarding Jonathan Swift that "its writers are far more talented, and their output will be read long after that hack Swift's has been lost to the sands of time".

Russian invasion of Ukraine
The website appeared to take a slightly pro-Russian stance regarding Russia's full-scale invasion of Ukraine in February 2022. Multiple satiric articles have been published, with the major themes tapping into the United States' involvement in foreign wars as a way to diminish the moral outrage to the Russian invasion, alleging that America wants to protect Ukraine only because its citizens are white, and that sending weapons only prolongs the conflict. Additionally, the articles suggested the Ukrainian government is not necessarily better than the Russian government and ridiculed the world's lack of attention to other wars and conflicts outside of Ukraine.

See also

 List of satirical magazines
 List of satirical news websites
 List of satirical television news programs

References

Further reading

External links 

 

The Onion
Publications disestablished in 2013
Former Univision Communications subsidiaries
Fusion Media Group
Internet properties established in 1988
Mass media in Madison, Wisconsin
Newspapers published in Wisconsin
Online newspapers with defunct print editions
Satirical newspapers
Satirical websites
Webby Award winners

2019 mergers and acquisitions
1990s in comedy
2000s in comedy
2010s in comedy
2020s in comedy